textsound journal (textsound) is an audio online literary magazine that publishes experimental poetry and sound.

History
textsound began in 2008 as a bi-annual publication under the editorial direction of Anya Cobler, Adam Fagin, Anna Vitale, and Laura Wetherington.

Selected contributors
 Jaap Blonk
 Anne-James Chaton
 Paul DeMarinis
 Linh Dinh
 Kenneth Goldsmith
 Rick Moody
 Thylias Moss
 Alice Notley
 Alva Noto
 Leslie Scalapino
 Anne Tardos
 Edwin Torres
 Anne Waldman

Events
On April 5, 2008, the textsound editorial collective organized a celebration in Ypsilanti, Michigan for the journal's launch featuring Barrett Watten, Joel Levise, Christine Hume, James Marks, and Viki.

In the fall of 2008, the textsound collective teamed-up with Megan Levad and Adam Boehmer to curate the Work-In-Progress Reading Series at the Crazy Wisdom Bookstore in Ann Arbor, Michigan. Performers included Vievee Francis, Jill Darling, Onna Solomon, Sandy Tolbert, Aaron McCollough, Adam Boehmer, Michael Shilling, David Karczynski, T Hetzel, Katie Hartsock, Meghann Rotary, Anna Prushnikaya, and Stephanie Rowden.

See also
List of literary magazines

External links
textsound's website
Self-Consuming Artifacts … towards an unquiet metaphysics A blog posting by American poet Aaron McCollough on Barrett Watten & textsound, initiated by the 2008 crisis in "Tibet" (& "Tibet" being the title of a Watten poem)
2008 Work-In-Progress Reading Series Blog

American literature websites
Magazines established in 2008
Magazines published in Michigan
Monthly magazines published in the United States
Online literary magazines published in the United States
Poetry magazines published in the United States
Sound